Banco del Café (English: Bank of the Coffee), commonly known as Bancafé, was a bank in Guatemala that collapsed because of bad loans and panicked withdrawals set off by an investigation by Guatemala's Superintendencia de Bancos in 2006.  This eventually brought the bank down.

References

Companies of Guatemala